The 2017 Hawaii Tennis Open was a professional tennis tournament played on outdoor hard courts. It was the second edition of the tournament and part of the 2017 WTA 125K series, offering a total of $115,000 in prize money. It took place in Waipio near Honolulu, United States, on 20–26 November 2017.

Singles main draw entrants

Seeds 

 1 Rankings as of 13 November 2017.

Other entrants 
The following player received wildcards into the singles main draw:
  Michaela Gordon
  Allie Kiick
  Anastasia Pivovarova
  Taysia Rogers
  Zhang Shuai

The following players received entry from the qualifying draw:
  Han Na-lae 
  Haruka Kaji
  Claire Liu
  Katherine Sebov

Withdrawals
Before the tournament
  Catherine Bellis →replaced by  Miharu Imanishi
  Louisa Chirico →replaced by  Ayano Shimizu
  Kayla Day →replaced by  Usue Maitane Arconada
  Francesca Schiavone →replaced by  Danielle Lao

Doubles entrants

Seeds 

 1 Rankings as of 13 November 2017.

Champions

Singles

  Zhang Shuai def.  Jang Su-jeong 0–6, 6–2, 6–3

Doubles

  Hsieh Shu-ying /  Hsieh Su-wei def.  Eri Hozumi /  Asia Muhammad, 6–1, 7–6(7–3)

External links 
 Official website

Hawaii Tennis Open
2017 WTA 125K series
2017 in American tennis
2017 in sports in Hawaii
November 2017 sports events in the United States